BNS Ulka  is an establishment of the Bangladeshi Navy.

Career
The Ulka is currently serving under the Commander Chittagong Naval Area(COMCHIT). About 200 personnel serve at Ulka, which is one of the smaller bases in the Bangladesh Navy. Ulka was established as a Naval Base to assist with missile operations. It is administrated by the larger BNS Isa Khan base.

See also
List of active ships of the Bangladesh Navy

References

Shore establishments of the Bangladesh Navy
Bangladesh Navy bases